August 23 - Eastern Orthodox liturgical calendar - August 25

All fixed commemorations below are observed on September 6 by Eastern Orthodox Churches on the Old Calendar.

For August 24, Orthodox Churches on the Old Calendar commemorate the Saints listed on August 11

Saints

 Hieromartyr Eutychius (1st century), disciple of St. John the Theologian.
 Martyr Tation, at Claudiopolis (Bithynia) (305)
 Virginmartyr Kyra of Persia (558)
 Saint George Limniotes the Confessor, of Mount Olympus in Bithynia (716)

Pre-Schism Western saints

 Saint Ptolemy (Ptolemaeus), by tradition a disciple of the Apostle Peter, he became Bishop of Nepi in Tuscany in Italy, where he was martyred (1st century)
 Saint Romanus of Nepi, a Bishop and martyr of Nepi in Tuscany, Italy, by tradition a disciple of St Ptolemy (1st century)
 Saint Aurea of Ostia, an early martyr in Ostia in Italy (c. 270)
 Saint Patrick, a bishop in Ireland, surnamed Patrick the Elder, whose relics were later enshrined at Glastonbury in England (c. 450)
 Saint Yrchard (Irchard, Yarcard), a priest in Scotland, consecrated bishop by St Ternan to work among the Picts  (5th century)
 Saint Ouen (Audöenus, Audoin, Aldwin, Owen, Dado), Archbishop of Rouen, Gaul, Confessor (c. 683)
 Saint Bregwin, Twelfth Archbishop of Canterbury (764)
 Saint Sandratus (Sandradus), Abbot of Gladbach, and in 981 Abbot of Weissenburg (986)

Post-Schism Orthodox saints

 Saint Martyrius, Archbishop of Novgorod (1199)
 Hieromartyr Athanasius II, Patriarch of Jerusalem (1244)
 Venerable Arsenius, founder of Komel Monastery (Vologda), Wonderworker (1550)
 Venerable Serapion the Wonderworker, abbot of the Monastery of St. John the Baptist at David Gareja monastery complex, Georgia (1774)
 New Hieromartyr Cosmas of Aetolia, Equal-to-the-Apostles (1779)  (see also: August 4)
 Saint Aristocleus, Elder, of Moscow and Mount Athos (1918)

New martyrs and confessors

 New Hieromartyr Maxim Sandovich, Priest, of Lemkovina, Poland (1914)
 New Hieromartyr Seraphim (Shakhmut), Archimandrite, of Grodno (Belarus) (1946)

Other commemorations

 Icon of the Most Holy Theotokos "Petrovskaya" ("of St. Peter of Moscow") (ca. 1306)
 Appearance of the Most Holy Theotokos (c. 1385) to St. Sergius of Radonezh (1392)
 Translation of the relics (1479) of St. Peter of Moscow, Metropolitan of Kiev and Moscow (1326)
 Translation of the relics (1716) of St. Dionysios of Zakynthos, Archbishop of Aegina (1624)

Icon gallery

Notes

References

Sources
 August 24 / September 6. Orthodox Calendar (PRAVOSLAVIE.RU).
 September 6 / August 24. Holy Trinity Russian Orthodox Church (A parish of the Patriarchate of Moscow).
 August 24. OCA - The Lives of the Saints.
 The Autonomous Orthodox Metropolia of Western Europe and the Americas (ROCOR). St. Hilarion Calendar of Saints for the year of our Lord 2004. St. Hilarion Press (Austin, TX). pp. 62-63.
 The Twenty-Fourth Day of the Month of August. Orthodoxy in China.
 August 24. Latin Saints of the Orthodox Patriarchate of Rome.
 The Roman Martyrology. Transl. by the Archbishop of Baltimore. Last Edition, According to the Copy Printed at Rome in 1914. Revised Edition, with the Imprimatur of His Eminence Cardinal Gibbons. Baltimore: John Murphy Company, 1916. pp. 255-256.
 Rev. Richard Stanton. A Menology of England and Wales, or, Brief Memorials of the Ancient British and English Saints Arranged According to the Calendar, Together with the Martyrs of the 16th and 17th Centuries. London: Burns & Oates, 1892. p. 411.

 Greek Sources
 Great Synaxaristes:  24 ΑΥΓΟΥΣΤΟΥ. ΜΕΓΑΣ ΣΥΝΑΞΑΡΙΣΤΗΣ.
  Συναξαριστής. 24 Αυγούστου. ECCLESIA.GR. (H ΕΚΚΛΗΣΙΑ ΤΗΣ ΕΛΛΑΔΟΣ).

 Russian Sources
  6 сентября (24 августа). Православная Энциклопедия под редакцией Патриарха Московского и всея Руси Кирилла (электронная версия). (Orthodox Encyclopedia - Pravenc.ru).

August in the Eastern Orthodox calendar